The 2021–22 Cymru Premier (known as the JD Cymru Premier for sponsorship reasons) was the 30th season of the Cymru Premier (formally known as the Welsh Premier League), the highest football league within Wales since its establishment in 1992. Connah's Quay Nomads were the defending champions. Teams played each other twice on a home and away basis, before the league split into two groups after phase 1 matches were  completed. Due to Wales losing a European place, the format of the play-offs changed, with the prize now being a place in the Scottish Challenge Cup.

Teams
Twelve teams competed in the league – the same twelve teams as the previous season. Due to the COVID-19 pandemic, the Cymru North and Cymru South leagues were unable to be played the previous season, therefore no teams were able to be promoted. As every team already in the premier league had been granted a Tier 1 license, there was no need for any team to be relegated.

Stadia and locations

Personnel and kits

Managerial changes

League table

Results
13 August 2021 – 26 February 2022

Matches 1–22

Matches 23–32

Top six

Bottom six

Scottish Challenge Cup play-offs

Semi-finals

Final

Season statistics

Top scorers

Hat-tricks

Notes
(H) – Home team(A) – Away team

Top assists

Monthly awards

Annual awards

Fair Play award
The winner for each respective division's FAW Fair Play Table was to be given £1,000 prize money and the FAW Fair Play Trophy. 

The winners of the Nationwide Building Society Fair Play Award for the 2021-2022 Cymru Premier season are Connah's Quay Nomads

References 

Cymru Premier seasons
2021–22 in Welsh football
Wales